Villard Denis (1940–2004), also known as Davertige, was a Haitian poet and painter.  Born in Port-au-Prince, Denis grew up in Haiti but later moved to Paris, France where he lived for several years.  Denis' paintings have been exhibited in Mexico, Spain, France, and Canada.

Notes

References

External links
 Brief Overview of Haitian Art including Villard Denis

1940 births
2004 deaths
Haitian male poets
People from Port-au-Prince
20th-century Haitian painters
20th-century male artists
Haitian male painters
20th-century Haitian poets
20th-century male writers
Haitian expatriates in France